Dave Weckl (born January 8, 1960 in St. Louis, Missouri) is an American jazz fusion drummer and the leader of the Dave Weckl Band. He was inducted into the Modern Drummer Hall of Fame in 2000.

Biography
Weckl started playing his first set of drums at age 8 in his spare room along to records. He later played in the living room, sometimes with his father on piano. Weckl studied at the University of Bridgeport. Starting out on the New York fusion scene in the early 1980s, Weckl soon began working with artists such as Paul Simon, George Benson, Michel Camilo, Robert Plant, and Anthony Jackson.

He was with the Chick Corea Elektric Band from 1985 to 1991. During this time he performed on many albums and also appeared with Corea's Akoustic Band. He said he "augmented his work with Corea by continuing his session work and appearing often with the GRP All-Star Big Band". Weckl has released a series of instructional videotapes. His first recording as leader was in 1990 – Master Plan, for GRP. This was followed by Heads Up in 1992, and Hard-Wired in 1994. Later on, Weckl recorded and toured with guitarist Mike Stern.

Discography
Dave Weckl:
 1990 – Master Plan (GRP)
 1992 – Heads Up (GRP)
 1993 – J.K. Special (Lipstick)
 1994 – Hard Wired (GRP)

Dave Weckl Band:
 1998 – Rhythm of the Soul (Stretch)
 1999 – Synergy (Stretch)
 2000 – Transition (Stretch)
 2001 – The Zone (Stretch)
 2002 – Perpetual Motion (Stretch)
 2003 – Live (And Very Plugged In) (Stretch)
 2005 – Multiplicity (Stretch)

Dave Weckl and Jay Oliver:
 2014 – Convergence

The Dave Weckl Acoustic Band:
 2015 – Of the Same Mind
 2016 - The Dave Weckl Acoustic Band - Live DVD

Dave Weckl with Omar Faqir:
 2018 – Pulse Album Now & Forever & Giant Sticks

As sideman

With Bill Connors
Step It (Pathfinder, 1984 [1985])

With Gerry Niewood
Share My Dream (DMP, 1985)

With Chuck Loeb and Andy LaVerne
Magic Fingers (DMP, 1989)

With the GRP All-Star Big Band
 GRP All-Star Big Band (GRP, 1992)
 Dave Grusin Presents GRP All-Star Big Band Live! (GRP, 1993)
 All Blues (GRP, 1995)

With Nick Levinovsky
 Special Opinion (Butman Music, 2013)

With Chris Minh Doky
 CMD & The Nomads (Red Dot, 2014)

With School of the Arts featuring T Lavitz
 School of the Arts (Magnatude, 2007)

Videos 
 1988 – Back to Basics (DCI music)
 1990 – The Next Step (DCI music)
 1993 – Working It Out: Latin Percussion I - With Walfredo Reyes, Sr. (DCI music)
 1993 – Working It Out: Latin Percussion II - With Walfredo Reyes, Sr. (DCI Music)
 2000 – How to Develop Your Own Sound (Carl Fischer publishing)
 2000 – How to Practice (Carl Fischer publishing)
 2000 – How to Develop Technique (Carl Fischer publishing)
 2015 - Flies on The Wall / Convergence Behind The Scenes (DVD, Bluray)

Books 
 1988 – Back to Basics
 1992 – The Next Step (Manhattan Music)
 1994 – Contemporary Drummer + One (Manhattan Music)
 1997 – Ultimate Play-Along for Drums level I vol. I (Alfred Publishing Company)
 1997 – Ultimate Play-Along for Drums level I vol. II (Alfred Publishing Company)
 2001 – In Session with the Dave Weckl Band (Carl Fischer Music)
 2004 – Exercises for Natural Playing (Carl Fischer Music)

References

External links
Dave Weckl profile, Drummerworld; accessed August 4, 2015.
Dave Weckl profile, OnlineDrummer.com; accessed August 4, 2015.
Dave Weckl Interview NAMM Oral History Library (2008)

Jazz fusion musicians
American jazz drummers
GRP Records artists
University of Bridgeport alumni
1960 births
Living people
American session musicians
Singers from Missouri
Musicians from St. Louis
Musicians from New York City
Musicians from Los Angeles
Aztec Camera members
20th-century American drummers
American male drummers
Jazz musicians from New York (state)
Jazz musicians from California
Jazz musicians from Missouri
20th-century American male musicians
American male jazz musicians
Chick Corea Elektric Band members
GRP All-Star Big Band members
Manhattan Jazz Quintet members